Bill Bleil (born February 23, 1959) is an American football coach and former player who is currently the offensive line coach for the Stephen F. Austin Lumberjacks of the Western Athletic Conference (WAC). He played college football at Northwestern and has also coached the New Mexico Highlands Cowboys, Dana Vikings, Eastern New Mexico Greyhounds, Northwestern Red Raiders, Pacific Tigers, Western Carolina Catamounts, South Dakota Coyotes, Northern Illinois Huskies, Pittsburgh Panthers, Akron Zips, Iowa State Cyclones, Rhode Island Rams, Missouri Southern Lions, Lamar Cardinals, and Mary Hardin–Baylor Crusaders.

Early life and education
Bill Bleil was born on February 23, 1959, in Remsen, Iowa, and grew up there on his father's farm. He attended Remsen-Union High School, where he was an all-star at the tailback and defensive back positions. He played college football at Northwestern College from 1977 to 1980, earning two NAIA all-district honors while playing linebacker. He graduated in 1981 with a Bachelor of Arts degree in physical education. He earned a master's degree from New Mexico Highlands University in 1982.

Coaching career
From 1981 to 1982, Bleil served as a graduate assistant and part-time volunteer at New Mexico Highlands University. He was named a full-time assistant in 1983, serving as defensive coordinator. For a single season in 1984, Bleil was the defensive coordinator of the Dana Vikings in Iowa.

Bleil was named offensive line coach at Eastern New Mexico University in 1985, serving three seasons in that position before being promoted to offensive coordinator in 1988. He left the school following the 1989 season. Eastern New Mexico ranked top 25 in the NCAA Division II in four of his five seasons with the school.

In 1990, Bleil was named offensive line coach at his alma mater of Northwestern College, where he served two seasons.

Bleil was named offensive line coach of Division I Pacific University in 1992, serving in that position for one year before being promoted to offensive coordinator in 1993.

In 1996, after Pacific discontinued their football program, Bleil was named offensive coordinator as well as offensive line coach at Western Carolina University. He was promoted to head coach following the firing of Steve Hodgin, who had hired Bleil one year earlier. In his head coaching debut, Western Carolina lost to Liberty in the season opener. After a 3–8 record that year, Bleil rebounded in 1998 with a 6–5 mark, the first winning season for the school since 1994.

Despite high expectations, Bleil's 1999 Western Carolina team finished with just three wins after being heavily injured. The school compiled a 4–7 record in 2000. He led them to a 7–4 record in 2001, being named conference coach of the year, but was fired by the school, leading to the outrage of many of the team's fans.

After being fired by Western Carolina, Bleil accepted a position with the South Dakota Coyotes as offensive coordinator. He was named tight ends coach at Northern Illinois University in 2003. He left them after one season and was subsequently hired by the University of Pittsburgh to coach the tight ends and offensive line.

In 2005, Bleil was hired by Akron University as running backs coach. In his first year with the school, he helped running back Brett Biggs earn second-team all-conference honors with over 1,200 rushing yards. His position was changed in 2007 to offensive tackles coach and tight ends coach.

Bleil was named assistant head coach and offensive line coach at Iowa State University at the end of 2008. After four seasons in that position, he gave up his offensive line duties for the tight ends while retaining his role as assistant head coach. While coaching the offensive line, five of his players made it into the National Football League (NFL).

Bleil left for Rhode Island in 2014 to be offensive coordinator and offensive line coach. He held that role for two seasons before leaving for Missouri Southern in 2016. He spent two years with Missouri Southern before accepting a position at Lamar to coach the offensive line in 2018. He was promoted to co-offensive coordinator in 2019 while retaining his role of offensive line coach.

From 2020 to 2021, Bleil was an assistant coach at the University of Mary Hardin–Baylor. In January 2022, he was named offensive line coach at Stephen F. Austin University.

Personal life
Bleil is married to Laurel Tjernagel of Roland, Iowa. They have two children.

Bleil's brother Fred was also a coach for several college teams until his death in 2011. The two brothers faced off against each other in a 2006 game between Akron and North Texas.

Head coaching record

References

External links
 Stephen F. Austin profile

1959 births
Living people
American football linebackers
Akron Zips football coaches
Dana Vikings football coaches
Eastern New Mexico Greyhounds football coaches
Iowa State Cyclones football coaches
Lamar Cardinals football coaches
Mary Hardin–Baylor Crusaders football coaches
Missouri Southern Lions football coaches
New Mexico Highlands Cowboys football coaches
Northern Illinois Huskies football coaches
Northwestern Red Raiders football coaches
Northwestern Red Raiders football players
Pacific Tigers football coaches
Pittsburgh Panthers football coaches
Rhode Island Rams football coaches
South Dakota Coyotes football coaches
Stephen F. Austin Lumberjacks football coaches
Western Carolina Catamounts football coaches
New Mexico Highlands University alumni
Coaches of American football from Iowa
Players of American football from Iowa